This is a list of articles in modern philosophy.

 1649 in philosophy
 1658 in philosophy
 17th century philosophy
 A Few Words on Non-Intervention
 A General View of Positivism
 A Letter Concerning Toleration
 A Philosophical Enquiry into the Origin of Our Ideas of the Sublime and Beautiful
 A System of Logic
 A Treatise Concerning the Principles of Human Knowledge
 A Vindication of Natural Society
 Adam Müller
 Adam Smith
 Adam Weishaupt
 Age of Enlightenment
 Alexander Gottlieb Baumgarten
 Alexander Pfänder
 Aloys Hirt
 American Enlightenment
 An Enquiry Concerning the Principles of Morals
 Anarchism
 Anarchism and anarcho-capitalism
 Anarchism in Korea
 Anarchism in Russia
 Anarchism in Spain
 Anarchism in Sweden
 Anarchism in the United States
 Anarchism in Turkey
 Anarchism in Ukraine
 Anarchism in Vietnam
 Anarchism: A Documentary History of Libertarian Ideas
 Anarchist Manifesto
 Anarchy
 Anioł Dowgird
 Answering the Question: What Is Enlightenment?
 Anthony Ashley-Cooper, 3rd Earl of Shaftesbury
 Anti-statism
 Antoine Arnauld
 Anton Kržan
 Arnold Geulincx
 Arnold J. Toynbee
 Art manifesto
 Arthur Schopenhauer
 Arthur Schopenhauer's aesthetics
 Auberon Herbert
 Auguste Comte
 Augustus De Morgan
 Autonomism
 Baroque
 Benjamin Constant
 Bernard Bolzano
 Bête machine
 Beyond Good and Evil
 Black Panther Party
 Blaise Pascal
 Borden Parker Bowne
 Bourgeoisie
 Bronisław Trentowski
 Cartesian doubt
 Charles Batteux
 Charles de Secondat, baron de Montesquieu
 Charles Fourier
 Charles Graves (bishop)
 Charles Sanders Peirce
 Chemism
 Christian Discourses
 Christoph von Sigwart
 Class consciousness
 Classical Realism
 Classicism
 Cloudesley
 Commodity fetishism
 Communism
 Concluding Unscientific Postscript to Philosophical Fragments
 Cornelis Willem Opzoomer
 Criticisms of electoralism
 Critique of Judgement
 Critique of Practical Reason
 Critique of Pure Reason
 Cultural hegemony
 Dai Zhen
 Daniel-Henry Kahnweiler
 David Hume
 David Ricardo
 David Strauss
 Dharmarāja Adhvarin
 Diafotismos
 Dialectical materialism
 Die Anarchisten
 Direct action
 Disquisitions relating to Matter and Spirit
 Edifying Discourses in Diverse Spirits
 Edward Abramowski
 Edward Dembowski
 Egoist anarchism
 Either/Or
 Émile Pouget
 Ernst Mach
 Ernst Schröder
 Fear and Trembling
 Feliks Jaroński
 For Self-Examination
 Francesco Saverio Merlino
 Francis Bacon
 Francis Hutcheson (philosopher)
 Franciszek Krupiński
 Friedrich Daniel Ernst Schleiermacher
 Friedrich Engels
 Friedrich Groos
 Friedrich Nietzsche
 Friedrich Schiller
 Friedrich Theodor Vischer
 Friedrich Wilhelm Joseph Schelling
 General will
 Geohumoral theory
 Georg Friedrich Meier
 Georg Wilhelm Friedrich Hegel
 George Berkeley
 George Boole
 Giorgio Vasari
 Gottfried Leibniz
 Gotthold Ephraim Lessing
 Groundwork of the Metaphysic of Morals
 Hannah Arendt
 Harriet Taylor Mill
 Hayashi Hōkō
 Hayashi Razan
 Hayashi Ryūkō
 Hegelianism
 Heimin Shimbun
 Henri Bergson
 Henry David Thoreau
 Henry Home, Lord Kames
 Herbert Spencer
 Hirata Atsutane
 Historical materialism
 Hosoi Heishu
 Hoter ben Shlomo
 Howard Williams (humanitarian)
 Hugo Grotius
 Idea for a Universal History with a Cosmopolitan Purpose
 Immanuel Kant
 Individualist anarchism
 Isaak Iselin
 Itō Jinsai
 Jakob Friedrich Fries
 James Guillaume
 Jan Wacław Machajski
 Jean-Jacques Rousseau
 Jean le Rond d'Alembert
 Jena romantics
 Jens Kraft
 Jeremy Bentham
 Jewish Communist Labour Party (Poalei Zion)
 Jewish Communist Party (Poalei Zion)
 Jewish Communist Union (Poalei Zion)
 Johann Christian Lossius
 Johann Friedrich Flatt
 Johann Gottlieb Fichte
 Johann Heinrich Lambert
 Johann Joachim Lange
 Johann Wolfgang von Goethe
 Johannes Bredenburg
 Johannes Phocylides Holwarda
 John Austin (legal philosopher)
 John Calvin
 John Dewey
 John Locke
 John Stuart Mill
 Józef Gołuchowski
 Judah Leon Abravanel
 Judge for Yourselves!
 Justice as Fairness: A Restatement
 Kaibara Ekken
 Karl Heinrich Heydenreich
 Karl Marx
 Karl Wilhelm Friedrich Schlegel
 Karl Wilhelm Ramler
 Kitaro Nishida
 Krastyo Krastev
 Krystyn Lach Szyrma
 Lazarus Geiger
 Lectures on Aesthetics
 Léon Dumont
 Letters to a Philosophical Unbeliever
 Lettre sur les aveugles à l'usage de ceux qui voient
 Levi Hedge
 Leviathan (book)
 Lex, Rex
 Libertarian Marxism
 Libertarian socialism
 List of communist ideologies
 Ludwig Andreas Feuerbach
 Ludwig Tieck
 Luo Rufang
 Man a Machine
 Martin Luther
 Marx's theory of alienation
 Marx's theory of human nature
 Marxist feminism
 Marxist humanism
 Marxist philosophy
 Mary Wollstonecraft
 Max Weber
 Meditations on First Philosophy
 Meinong's jungle
 Memoirs Illustrating the History of Jacobinism
 Metaphysical Foundations of Natural Science
 Metaphysics of Morals
 Methodios Anthrakites
 Michael Gottlieb Birckner
 Michael Hissmann
 Michał Wiszniewski
 Michel Henry
 Mikhail Bakunin
 Miura Baien
 Modern philosophy
 Moses Mendelssohn
 Motoori Norinaga
 Muhammad Iqbal
 Mulla Sadra
 Muro Kyūsō
 New England Transcendentalists
 Nicholas Leonicus Thomaeus
 Nicolas Malebranche
 Nicolaus Hieronymus Gundling
 Nietzsche's views on women
 Nietzsche and Philosophy
 Nikolai Putyatin
 Non-politics
 Non-voting
 Novum Organum
 Observations on Man
 Observations on the Feeling of the Beautiful and Sublime
 Ogyū Sorai
 On Liberty
 On the Concept of Irony with Continual Reference to Socrates
 On the Genealogy of Morality
 Oration on the Dignity of Man
 Outline of anarchism
 Paul Rée
 Philosophical Fragments
 Philosophical Inquiries into the Essence of Human Freedom
 Philosophy of Max Stirner
 Philosophy of Spinoza
 Pierre-Joseph Proudhon
 Pierre Cally
 Pierre Gassendi
 Pierre Nicole
 Poale Zion
 Political Justice
 Political philosophy of Immanuel Kant
 Port-Royal Logic
 Practice in Christianity
 Prefaces
 Prolegomena to Any Future Metaphysics
 Proletariat
 Property is theft!
 Randall Swingler
 Rate of exploitation
 Reification (Marxism)
 Relations of production
 Relationship between Friedrich Nietzsche and Max Stirner
 René Descartes
 Repetition (Kierkegaard)
 Revolutionary Left (disambiguation)
 Richard Sault
 Robert Leslie Ellis
 Roger Fry
 Rudolf Seydel
 Rudolph Goclenius
 Samuel Taylor Coleridge
 Schopenhauer's criticism of the proofs of the parallel postulate
 Science of Logic
 Scottish School of Common Sense
 Sebastian Petrycy
 Seo Gyeong-deok
 Simion Bărnuțiu
 Sir William Hamilton, 9th Baronet
 Social ecology
 Socialism
 Søren Kierkegaard
 Spinoza: Practical Philosophy
 Stages on Life's Way
 Statism and Anarchy
 Stoicorum Veterum Fragmenta
 Structural Marxism
 Sturm und Drang
 Suzuki Shōsan
 Tan Sitong
 The Art of Being Right
 The Blood of Others
 The Book on Adler
 The Communist Manifesto
 The Concept of Anxiety
 The Crisis and a Crisis in the Life of an Actress
 The Doctrine of Philosophical Necessity Illustrated
 The False Subtlety of the Four Syllogistic Figures
 The Foundations of Arithmetic
 The Law of Peoples
 The Methods of Ethics
 The Only Possible Argument in Support of a Demonstration of the Existence of God
 The Phenomenology of Spirit
 The Point of View of My Work as an Author
 The Sickness Unto Death
 The Soul of Man under Socialism
 The Subjection of Women
 Thomas Carlyle
 Thomas Hobbes
 Thomas Jefferson
 Thomas Paine
 Thomas Robert Malthus
 Thoughts on the True Estimation of Living Forces
 Three Critics of the Enlightenment
 Toju Nakae
 Tychism
 Universal Natural History and Theory of Heaven
 Utilitarianism (book)
 Vasily Jakovlevich Zinger
 Victor d'Hupay
 Voltaire
 Walter Goodnow Everett
 War of Anti-Christ with the Church and Christian Civilization
 What Is Property?
 Wilhelm Heinrich Wackenroder
 Wilhelm Windelband
 Wilhelm Wundt
 William Blackstone
 William Godwin
 William Graham Sumner
 William Manderstown
 William Whewell
 Works of Love
 Writing Sampler
 Yamaga Sokō
 Yamazaki Ansai
 Yi I

 1
Modern